Catechin-7-O-glucoside is a flavan-3-ol glycoside formed from catechin.

Natural occurrences 
Catechin-7-O-glucoside can be isolated from the hemolymph of the European pine sawfly (Neodiprion sertifer). It also occurs in relatively large quantities in cowpea (Vigna unguiculata) as the dominant flavan-3-ol monomer, and actually accounts for up to 70% of cowpea proanthocyanidins (tannins).

It can also be produced by biotransformation of (+)-catechin by cultured cells of Eucalyptus perriniana.

Presence in natural traditional drugs 
Catechin-7-O-glucoside can be found in Paeoniae Radix, the crude drug made from roots of the Chinese peony (Paeonia lactiflora), in the red knotweed (Bistorta macrophylla, also known as Polygonum macrophyllum), in the stem barks of the Nepali hog plum (Choerospondias axillaris),  in the Korean plum yew (Cephalotaxus koreana) and in Huanarpo Macho (Jatropha macrantha). (−)-Catechin 7-O-β-d-glucopyranoside is found in the bark of Rhaphiolepis umbellata.

Presence in food 
It is found in buckwheat groats, in the red bean (the seed of Vigna umbellata, formerly known as Phaseolus calcaratus), in barley (Hordeum vulgare L.) and malt. (−)-Catechin 7-O-β-d-glucopyranoside is found in rhubarb.

Health effects 
This compound has an antioxidant activity leading to a cytoprotective effect.

References 

Flavanols
Flavonoid glucosides